The Masaesyli were a Berber tribe of western Numidia (present day Algeria) and the main antagonists of the Massylii in eastern Numidia. 

During the Second Punic War the Masaesyli initially supported the Roman Republic and were led by Syphax against the Massylii, who were led by Masinissa, as an ally of the Carthaginian Republic. After Masinissa and the Massylii switched sides to Rome, the Masaesyli turned against Rome and allied with Hasdrubal Gisco. Syphax was defeated, however, and spent the remainder of his days in Roman captivity, while his tribe was assimilated into the kingdom of Masinissa.

Notes

Numidia
Ancient African people

Berber peoples and tribes